Sug was a Japanese rock band founded in 2006.

Sug may also refer to:

 Sulu (also spelled sug), an autonomous island province of the Philippines
 Surg, Birjand, South Khorasan Province, Iran, a village also known as Sūg
 Sug Cornelius (1906–1968), American baseball pitcher in the Negro leagues
 SUG, IATA code for Surigao Airport, Philippines
 sug, ISO 639-3 code for the Suganga language, spoken in New Guinea

See also
Sugg, surname
Suggs (born 1961), English singer
Suggs (surname)